Royal Air Force Staplehurst or more simply RAF Staplehurst is a former Royal Air Force Advanced Landing Ground located in Kent, England.

Opened in 1943, Staplehurst was a prototype for temporary Advanced Landing Grounds built in France after D-Day, and as the Allied forces moved east across France and Germany. It was used by the Royal Air Force, Canadian and the United States Army Air Forces.  It was closed in September 1944.

Today the airfield is a mixture of agricultural fields with no recognisable remains, except a memorial now near the site.

History
The USAAF Ninth Air Force required several temporary Advanced Landing Ground (ALG) along the channel coast prior to the June 1944 Normandy invasion to provide tactical air support for the ground forces landing in France.

The following units were here at some point:
 No. 126 Airfield RAF
 No. 401 Squadron RCAF (1943) flying Supermarine Spitfire VB's
 No. 411 Squadron RCAF (1943) flying Supermarine Spitfire VB's
 No. 412 Squadron RCAF (1943) flying Supermarine Spitfire VB's
 No. 3207 Servicing Commando
 No. 3209 Servicing Commando

USAAF use
Staplehurst was known as USAAF Station AAF-413 for security reasons by the USAAF during the war, and by which it was referred to instead of location.  Its USAAF Station Code was "SH".

363rd Fighter Group 
Staplehurst was chosen to house one of the Ninth Air Force's two North American P-51B Mustang fighter groups (The other being the 354th Fighter Group), and the 363d Fighter Group moved into Staplehurst on 14 April from RAF Rivenhall. The group consisted of the following operational squadrons and fuselage codes:
 380th Fighter Squadron (A9)
 381st Fighter Squadron (B3)
 382nd Fighter Squadron (C3)
 
On 30 June the 363rd was alerted for movement to the Continent, its new base being the airfield at Maupertus (ALG A-15), near Cherbourg.

Current use
Upon its release from military use, within a year there was little left to indicate that these  to the east of Staplehurst village had once been a thriving fighter airfield.  Today, the farmland that was once RAF Staplehurst is unrecognizable as anything other than farmland.  The location of the airfield can only be discerned by looking at the aerial photography and following the path of Chickenden Lane, which runs almost parallel the former main 10/28 runway.   A few wartime buildings may be in agricultural use just to the northeast of the former airfield.

Memorial
There is a memorial now at this site located just off Chickenden Lane near the site of the former airfield. It was dedicated on 6 June 2010. It was attended by 95-year-old Col. John R. Ulricson who flew his P-51 "Lolita" from the Airfield, his son retired Army major C. Bruce Ulricson, who lives in Landaff and the patriarch's grandson, N.H. Army National Guard Major Davis K. Ulricson, of Ashland. Local fundraising efforts included bottles of "Ulricsons Finest Staplehurst Ale" which on the label show Ulricson in front of his "Lolita", which reportedly made him smile. There was a flypast that included a P-51D "Big Beautiful Doll". It was supposed to include two USAF F-15's and the Kent Spitfire, but they did not show up due to weather. The dedication was preceded by a service at the church in Staplehurst.

See also

List of former Royal Air Force stations

References

Citations

Bibliography

 Freeman, Roger A. (1994) UK Airfields of the Ninth: Then and Now 1994. After the Battle 
 Freeman, Roger A. (1996) The Ninth Air Force in Colour: UK and the Continent-World War Two. After the Battle 

 Maurer, Maurer (1983). Air Force Combat Units of World War II. Maxwell AFB, Alabama: Office of Air Force History. .
 USAAS-USAAC-USAAF-USAF Aircraft Serial Numbers--1908 to present

Airfields of the IX Fighter Command in the United Kingdom
Royal Air Force stations in Kent